Kutanovo (Qotan) is a rural locality (a village) in Irgizlinsky Selsoviet, Burzyansky District, Bashkortostan, Russia. The population was 317 as of 2010. There are 6 streets.

Geography 
Kutanovo is located 48 km southwest of Starosubkhangulovo (the district's administrative centre) by road. Irgizly is the nearest rural locality.

References 

Rural localities in Burzyansky District